The Utah Tech Trailblazers baseball team represents Utah Tech University (Formerly known as Dixie State), which is located in St. George, Utah. The Trailblazers are an NCAA Division I college baseball program that competes in the Western Athletic Conference. They competed in Division II from 2007 to 2020, playing ten seasons with the Pacific West Conference, and two with the Rocky Mountain Athletic Conference.

The Utah Tech Trailblazers play all home games on campus at Bruce Hurst Field.

Conference membership history (Division I only) 
2020–present: Western Athletic Conference (played 2020-2022 as Dixie State)

Bruce Hurst Field 

Bruce Hurst Field is a baseball stadium on the Utah Tech campus in St. George, Utah that seats 2,500 people. It opened in 1994 and has been the home of various other baseball teams and tournaments.

Head coaches (Division I only) 
Records taken from the DSU Baseball Almanac .

Year-by-year NCAA Division I results
Records taken from the DSU Baseball Almanac.

Awards and honors (Division I only)

Freshman All-Americans

Records taken from the DSU Baseball Almanac.

Trailblazers in the Major Leagues

Taken from baseball-reference.com.

See also
List of NCAA Division I baseball programs

References